The Libertarian Party of Nevada (LPN) is the affiliate of the Libertarian Party in the state of Nevada. It is headed by State Chair Charles Melchin.

History 
The Libertarian Party of Nevada is the third largest political party in the State of Nevada. It has existed since the founding of the Libertarian Party of the United States in 1971. It is considered a minor political party by the State of Nevada and has been since 1972. This status indicates that the LPN has ballot access, but no primary voting. Instead, it holds its own primary election during its State Conventions.

The Libertarian Party of Nevada has continued to grow in both influence and voter registration since its inception. This is largely due to the big-government ideologies of the Democratic and Republican parties; voters with libertarian ideologies began to look elsewhere.

Assemblyman John Moore of the 8th District switched party affiliation from the Republican Party to the Libertarian Party on January 8, 2016, giving the Libertarian Party their first Assembly seat in Nevada history. Moore went on to lose his re-election bid on November 8, 2016, after the state Libertarian Party censured him for votes cast during a special session of the Nevada Legislature.

Party platform 
The current platform for the party was ratified in May 2015 at the convention. The platform includes a variety of topics where civil liberties have been restricted or there has been an overreach by the government. These topics include: Marriage equality, reductions in alcohol regulation (including lowering the drinking age to 18), increasing jobs through encouraging competition, lowering taxes and fees on businesses, abolishing the minimum wage, increasing competition in education, returning federal lands to the State of Nevada and the people, ending eminent domain abuse, adding Constitutional Carry to the Nevada Constitution, promoting open-borders policies, and ending the War on Drugs.

Party bylaws 
The current bylaws for the Libertarian Party of Nevada were accepted in Convention in November 2013. The following constitutes a summary of those bylaws, which are presented in full on the Libertarian Party of Nevada's website.

 Preamble
People should be allowed to live as they choose so long as they do not initiate violence or engage in coercion, theft, or fraud. We adopt the Statement of Principles of the National Libertarian Party.

 I. Name
The name of this organization shall be The Libertarian Party of Nevada, hereinafter referred to as LPN.

 II. Object
The object of this organization shall be to elect Libertarians to public office within the state of Nevada.

 III. Membership
Section 1. General Membership: Any person registered to vote as LPN shall be considered a member of the LPN.

Section 2. Dues-paying Membership: Any resident of Nevada shall be considered a dues-paying member of the LPN provided they:

 Already qualify as a general member under Section 1,
 and have donated at least sixty dollars ($60) in monetary or in-kind contributions to the LPN in the past 365 days.

 IV. Convention
Section 1. The LPN shall hold a LPN State Convention (hereafter referred to as "Convention") in even-numbered years for the purpose of choosing Candidates for Public Office as well as whatever other business deemed necessary and proper. This includes, but is not limited to, amending bylaws, choosing delegates to the Libertarian Party National Convention, and filling vacancies in the executive committee. This convention shall take place before the beginning date for a minor political party to file its list of candidates with the Nevada Secretary of State's office. If the beginning date for a minor political party to file its list of candidates with the Secretary of State is prior to February 1 of the even-numbered year, then the Convention may be held up to 60 days before the first date to file even if that moves the convention to the previous year.

Section 2. The LPN shall hold a Convention in odd-numbered years anytime from January to May for the purpose of electing Executive Committee members, amending bylaws, and whatever other business deemed necessary and proper.

Section 3. A special Convention shall be held within one-hundred and twenty (120) days upon petition of one-third of the LPN members or a three-fourths vote of the executive committee. Such a petition shall state the business of the special Convention, and no other business shall be considered at such a Convention.

Section 4. All LPN members are qualified to be delegates to a LPN Convention. No Convention fee may be levied of any LPN member to participate in the business sessions of any Convention; however, fees may be required for participation in other convention events. A quorum of a Convention shall be a majority of the dues-paying members serving as delegates to the convention. The Convention Secretary shall provide the executive committee with draft convention minutes no later than ten (10) days after the conclusion of the State Convention, and the executive committee is empowered to approve Convention minutes. Only Dues-paying LPN members shall be eligible to serve as delegates to amend bylaws, choose delegates to the National Convention, and fill vacancies in the executive committee. All other business, including the selection of candidates for public office, is conducted by any LPN members serving as delegates.

Section 5. The executive committee shall publish the time, date, and location for Conventions at least sixty (60) days before the State Convention. This publication will be sufficient if it is prominently placed on the LPN's official website. The Secretary of the LPN shall mail notice to all dues-paying members at least 30 days before the convention.

Section 6. A nomination for "None of the above" (NOTA) shall be considered valid. Should NOTA receive a majority of the vote in the balloting for any office or candidacy, the names of all nominees shall be kept on the ballot but the nominations for that office shall be reopened for additional nominees and another ballot taken. In any election held at the State Convention, should NOTA receive a majority on two successive ballots, then no candidate shall be nominated for that office.

Section 7. The business session of each State Convention shall be recorded by video device and a copy of the recording shall be provided to the chair and the Secretary of the LPN along with the approved minutes from the state convention no later than thirty (30) days after the convention. In the event the proceedings of a State Convention are challenged by a LPN member, the recording of the convention and its minutes shall be provided to the Secretary and the Chair immediately - even if the minutes are in draft form.

Section 8. The LPN may nominate Candidates for Public Office by ballot of the convention during an even-numbered year.
           
 Candidates for President and Vice President shall be nominated by the National Convention of the Libertarian Party. The Secretary of the LPN will certify this nomination for the Nevada Secretary of State's office within thirty (30) days of the conclusion of the National Convention, or in accordance with Nevada Law, whichever is sooner.
 
 Candidates for United States Senator, all statewide offices, and any office for which the district lies within more than one affiliate shall be nominated at the convention.
 
 Affiliates may nominate candidates for any office where the district lies entirely within the affiliate's territory. The Secretary of an affiliate shall file a list of its nominated candidates with the Secretary of the LPN by the start of the convention.
 
 The LPN may nominate a candidate for any office that falls completely within one affiliate, unless the appropriate affiliate convention has either selected a candidate or voted NOTA for that office for that election. Only one candidate may be selected to be the nominee of the Libertarian Party for any partisan office.
 
 The Secretary of the LPN or the Secretary's representative shall file a list of the nominated candidates with the Secretary of State of Nevada, in accordance with Nevada law.
 
 Except for President and Vice President, candidates must be LPN members.
 
Section 9. National Convention Delegates. The LPN may nominate delegates to the Libertarian Party National Convention by majority vote of the convention during an even-numbered year.
           
 Should any vacancy arise prior to the start of the National Convention, the executive committee is empowered to select a replacement by a majority vote of the executive committee.
 Should a vacancy arise after the start of the National Convention, the credentialed delegates to the National Convention are empowered to select replacements by a majority vote. This vote shall be conducted by the delegate chair, who is selected by the majority of Nevada, National Convention, credentialed delegates.
 V. Executive Committee
Section 1. The executive committee (EC) of the LPN is responsible for handling the affairs and business of the LPN.

Section 2. The executive committee shall consist of seven members: Chair, Vice-chair, Secretary, Treasurer, Southern Regional Representative, Northern Regional Representative, and 1 At-Large Representative.

Section 3. The executive committee members shall be elected by a majority vote of the convention and shall serve until the end of the Convention at which their successors are elected. The executive committee shall be elected at odd-numbered year Conventions. In the event of a vacancy in an executive committee position, the executive committee shall fill the vacancy by Pro-Tempore appointment (a majority vote of the EC members), until the next Convention.

Section 4. Notwithstanding any other provision of these Bylaws, no member who has been convicted of a felony against person or property shall be an endorsed candidate, officer, or hold any other position of leadership in either the LPN or an affiliate without the consent of two-thirds vote of the executive committee members in favor.

Section 5. The executive committee members must be dues-paying members of the LPN. No member shall hold more than one office at a time within the LPN. Members of the LPN Executive Committee shall not be restricted from serving in officer or representative positions within an Affiliate. The executive committee members shall perform the duties prescribed by these bylaws and by the parliamentary authority adopted by the LPN. These duties shall include the following:

 The Chair shall preside at all LPN Executive Committee meetings and Conventions.
 The Vice Chair shall assist the chair in the performance of the Chair's duties. At meetings of the executive committee the Vice Chair shall preside in the absence of the chair, or in the case of a disciplinary hearing for any member of the LPN leadership (except when it is the vice-chair, then the Secretary shall preside).
 The Secretary shall record and maintain minutes of party meetings and conventions, and all non- financial records of the LPN including but not limited to these bylaws and all committee reports. The Secretary shall send out membership notices of meetings and conventions. The Secretary shall also follow all duties required by Nevada State law, including filing a list of candidates for partisan public office, filing a certificate of existence at least annually (or after any change to the EC or bylaws), and certifying the nomination for president and vice-president of the United States as selected by the Libertarian Party National Convention.
 The Treasurer shall maintain the LPN's bank accounts, deposit all revenues, and pay all bills. A formal Treasurer's Report shall be presented annually, at the convention. The Treasurer shall maintain the LPN's financial records in accordance with all applicable laws and Generally Accepted Accounting Principles (GAAP).
 The Northern Regional Representative shall represent and reside in one of the Counties of Washoe, Carson City, Storey, and Douglas. The Northern Regional Representative shall present a report of the LPN activities in the Northern part of Nevada annually at the convention.
 The Southern Regional Representative shall represent and reside in the County of Clark. The Southern Regional Representative shall present a report of the LPN activities in the Southern part of Nevada annually at the convention.
 The At-Large Representatives shall represent the entire state of Nevada.

Section 6. Meetings of the LPN Executive Committee shall be held at least quarterly, either in person or by publicly available electronic means. Additionally, the executive committee shall maintain an e-mail list or message board for conducting business in between quarterly meetings. A majority of the members of the executive committee shall constitute a quorum. Executive Committee Meetings shall be open to all LPN members, except when in Executive Session. Minutes of all Executive Committee meetings shall be posted on the LPN website no later than ten (10) days after they have been approved.

Section 7. Notice of the date, time, and location of Executive Committee Meetings shall be posted on the LPN web site within twenty-four (24) hours of when Executive Committee members receive such notice.

 VI. Affiliates
Section 1. Once five dues-paying members of the LPN have signed a letter indicating their willingness to serve as officers in a county affiliate, it shall be the responsibility of the LPN Executive Committee to hold an organizing convention.

Section 2. The organizing convention shall be scheduled in the county to be organized no sooner than thirty (30) days and no later than sixty (60) days after the LPN Executive Committee is presented with a letter as described in the aforementioned section.

Section 3. Timely notice of the affiliate organizing convention shall be mailed to all members of the Libertarian Party in the county at issue giving them notice of the meeting, time and place. Notice shall also be published prominently on the state party's website at least thirty (30) days before the affiliate convention.

Section 4. At the organizing convention, the members of the Libertarian Party in the county being organized shall elect officers. At the conclusion of the organizing convention, the affiliate is officially formed. The organizing convention shall be chaired by the State Chair or his/her designee approved by the executive committee. All LPN members who reside in the county boundaries in question and are in attendance at the organizing convention shall become voting members of the new affiliate by virtue of attending the organizing convention.

Section 5. All members of the Libertarian Party of Nevada that reside within an affiliated county shall automatically be a member of that affiliate.

Section 6. Each affiliate shall hold an Affiliate Convention every year prior to the convention. This Affiliate Convention shall be to amend the Affiliate Bylaws, nominate candidates for public office, or any other proper business. The Treasurer of the LPN and each Affiliate Treasurer shall work together to ensure Federal Election Commission (FEC) compliance.

Section 7. Each affiliate may nominate candidates for partisan public office to any office, which lies completely within its borders, subject to the provisions of Nevada law. NOTA is considered a candidate and the Convention shall not be able to nominate candidates to any office for which NOTA was nominated at an Affiliate Convention. Each Affiliate must report its list of nominated candidates to the LPN Secretary prior to the convention.

 VII. Parliamentary Procedure
The rules contained in the current edition of Robert's Rules of Order Newly Revised shall govern the LPN in all cases to which they apply, and in which they are not inconsistent with these bylaws, any special rules of order the LPN may adopt, and any statutes applicable to the LPN.

 VIII. Amendments
Section 1. These bylaws may be amended by a majority vote of two-thirds of the dues-paying member delegates at any Convention.

Section 2. To be considered in convention, all bylaws' amendment proposals must be presented in writing to the LPN Secretary at least seven days before the convention. An email address which can be used for these submissions shall be posted prominently on the web site. After a bylaws proposal is submitted, the Secretary shall post it on the LPN web site within three days.

Current Libertarian office-holders and committee members
The Libertarian Party of Nevada holds none of the state's six statewide offices, no seats in the Nevada Senate, and one seat in the Nevada Assembly. Libertarians hold none of the state's U.S. Senate seats and none of the state's four U.S. House of Representatives seats.
 Executive Committee
 Chair: Charles Melchin
 Vice-chair: Jeffery Hurley
 Treasurer: Bryan Elliott
 Secretary: Katie Banuelos
 Northern Regional Representative: Chris Orton
 Southern Regional Representative: Adam Haman
 At-Large Representative: Sam Toll
 Nevada Libertarian National Committee Members
 Timothy Hagan – LNC Treasurer

See also
 List of state parties of the Libertarian Party (United States)

References

External links
 Libertarian Party of Nevada

Nevada
Politics of Nevada
Political parties in Nevada